Juan René Verdugo Toledo (born 24 November 1949) is a Chilean former footballer who played as an attacking midfielder for clubs in Chile and Belgium.

Career
As a youth player, Verdugo was with Estrella de Plata in his city of birth. Next, he played for San Luis and Unión La Calera in the Chilean Segunda División before joining Santiago Wanderers in 1974.

A well remembered player of Santiago Wanderers (1974–76), they were the runner-up in the 1974 Copa Chile.

In his homeland, he also played for Regional Antofagasta and Audax Italiano in the top division before moving to Belgium. 

He went to Europa thanks to the Argentine former player of Palestino, José Rubulotta, who also helped another Chilean players to sign in Belgium such as Marcelo Urzúa, Eloy Vidal and Juvenal Olmos. In Belgium, he played for Waregem (1980–83) in the First Division, where he coincided with well-known Belgian players such as Marc and Luc Millecamps, Philippe Desmet, Hervé Delesie and Daniel Veyt. His last club was SC Wielsbeke in 1983.

Personal life
He made his home in Belgium and has taken part of friendly activities such as aid for Haiti.

References

External links
 
 Juan Verdugo at FootballDatabase.eu
 Juan Verdugo at MemoriaWanderers.cl 

1949 births
Living people
People from Quilpué
Chilean footballers
Chilean expatriate footballers
San Luis de Quillota footballers
Unión La Calera footballers
Santiago Wanderers footballers
C.D. Antofagasta footballers
Audax Italiano footballers
K.S.V. Waregem players
Primera B de Chile players
Chilean Primera División players
Belgian Pro League players
Chilean expatriate sportspeople in Belgium
Expatriate footballers in Belgium
Association football midfielders